Jason Wingard (born 1971) is an American academic and executive. He is the twelfth president of Temple University and the first African-American president in the institution’s 137-year history. He previously served in executive leadership roles at Columbia University, the Wharton School of the University of Pennsylvania, and Stanford University, as well as corporate workforce development at Goldman Sachs. 

He is the author of four books on the future of work and talent development and a frequent contributor to mainstream media outlets writing about higher education, diversity, leadership and career readiness.

Early life and education 
Jason Wingard was born on December 13, 1971, in Pittsburgh, Pennsylvania and moved to West Chester, Pennsylvania at age four. His father was a public school principal and superintendent who attended Temple University for graduate school, and his mother worked in human resources.

Wingard is a graduate of Henderson High School in West Chester, Pennsylvania, where he was a three-varsity sport athlete in basketball, football, and track and field. He was the 1990 high school Pennsylvania state champion in the 300m intermediate hurdles and was later inducted into the Henderson High School Wall of Fame.

Wingard received an athletic scholarship from Stanford University for football and track and field. A football wide receiver, tight end, and outside linebacker, he was a member of the 1992 Pac-10 Co-Champion team (now referred to as the Pac-12 Conference). In track, he competed for Stanford in the 400m hurdles and was named Pac-10 Conference Academic All-American Honorable Mention in 1992.

Wingard holds a Bachelor of Arts in sociology with honors from Stanford University, a Master of Arts in education from Emory University, a Master of Education in technology in education from Harvard University, and a Doctor of Philosophy in education, culture, and society from the University of Pennsylvania.

Career

Academic 
Wingard was appointed 12th president of Temple University in July 2021, and its first African American president since its founding in 1884. He previously served as Dean of Columbia University's School of Professional Studies, as well as Vice Dean of the Wharton School of the University of Pennsylvania, where he led the Aresty Institute of Executive Education. Before that, he was Executive Director of the Stanford Educational Leadership Institute (renamed the Stanford Educational Leadership Initiative) at Stanford University.

Wingard has taught leadership development courses at Columbia, Stanford and the Wharton School of the University of Pennsylvania.

Wingard has held executive education and leadership training with organizations including Columbia Athletics and LinKS@Wharton. In Columbia's fall semester of 2015, Wingard launched the Talks@Columbia thought leadership series. In 2016, he led a new "Global Human Capital Trends" course that was developed in partnership with Deloitte. Wingard introduced several access initiatives to offer Columbia's education to underserved populations, including the Columbia Girls in STEM Initiative and the Columbia HBCU Fellowship Initiative.

Corporate 
Wingard served as the Chief Learning Officer at Goldman Sachs where he was responsible for the strategy and implementation of learning solutions for the firm's global workforce. Since 2004, Wingard has served as President and CEO of The Education Board, Inc., a boutique management consulting firm and was Senior Vice President at ePals, Inc., a provider of school-safe collaborative learning products.

Board and leadership positions 
Wingard is a co-founder and Board Director of The Education Board Foundation, which provides financial assistance to disadvantaged populations, and arts, education, advocacy, and public service organizations that support those populations.

He is co-founder and Board Chair of the Zoeza Institute, which provides mentoring support, advisory services, and transition programming for foster care youth in Atlanta, GA, New York, NY, and Philadelphia, PA. He is also Co-Founder of the Philadelphia Youth Sports Collaborative.   He is a member of the Board of Directors of Kroll, a risk consulting company. He also currently serves on the board of the Roundabout Theatre Company in New York as well as the board of JUST Capital, an independent nonprofit that tracks, analyzes, and engages with large corporations and their investors on how they perform on the public’s priorities.  He previously served on the Board of Directors of Tides, a philanthropic partner and nonprofit accelerator dedicated to building a world of shared prosperity and social justice.

He sits on the membership committee of CEO Connection, served as a Director-at-Large on the University Professional and Continuing Education Association's Board of Directors,  and was an Affiliated Faculty member at the University of Pennsylvania’s Wharton Sports Business Initiative.

Wingard was a Senior Fellow at the Aspen Institute. He also previously served on the Boards for the National Center for Fathering, United Cerebral Palsy of Philadelphia, White Williams Scholars (now Philadelphia Futures), and served on the Peer Review Council of the Organization Development Journal.

Publications 
Wingard has published multiple books on professional education and leadership, including The Great Skills Gap: Optimizing Talent for the Future of Work, Learning to Succeed: Rethinking Corporate Education in a World of Unrelenting Change, Learning for Life: How Continuous Education Will Keep Us Competitive in the Global Knowledge Economy, and Win the Leadership Game: How Companies Can Create Unbeatable Global Teams.

His book, Learning to Succeed was named The Washington Post's Leadership Book of the Week in July 2015, listed on Soundview Executive Book Summaries' 30 Best Business Books of 2015, and was chosen as getAbstract's September's Top 3 Reads in 2015.

He is a senior contributor for Forbes and has written for or been featured in articles by media outlets including NPR, the Chicago Tribune, Huffington Post, Fortune, Inc., New York Daily News, Vanity Fair, and TheStreet.

Personal life 
Wingard and his wife have five children and reside in Philadelphia.

References

External links

Wingard's Twitter page

Temple University people
Harvard Graduate School of Education alumni
Stanford University alumni
Columbia University faculty
American chief executives of education-related organizations
Emory University alumni
University of Pennsylvania Graduate School of Education alumni
1971 births
Living people